The Gnome 9 Delta was a French designed, nine-cylinder, air-cooled rotary aero engine that was produced under license in Britain.

Variants
DeltaThe baseline 9-cylinder  rotary engine.
Delta-DeltaAn 18-cylinder  two-row rotary engine - Two Deltas on a common crankshaft.

Applications
List from Lumsden

Avro Type 500
Caudron Type L
Pemberton-Billing P.B.25
Royal Aircraft Factory S.E.2
Vickers No.7 Monoplane
Vickers F.B.9 Gunbus

Engines on display
A preserved Gnome 9 Delta engine is on public display at the Musée des Arts et Métiers, Paris

Specifications (9 Delta)

See also

References

Air-cooled aircraft piston engines
1900s aircraft piston engines
Delta
Rotary aircraft piston engines